Lukavica is a town in the municipalities of Istočno Novo Sarajevo, Republika Srpska , Bosnia and Herzegovina and Novo Sarajevo, Federation of Bosnia and Herzegovina, Bosnia and Herzegovina.

Demographics 

According to the 2013 census, its population was 8,616, with 7,785 of them living in the Republika Srpska part and 831 in the Federation part.

References

Cities and towns in Republika Srpska
Populated places in Istočno Novo Sarajevo